Clinton County Courthouse may refer to:

Clinton County Courthouse (Illinois)
Clinton County Courthouse (Indiana)
Clinton County Courthouse (Iowa)
Clinton County Courthouse (Ohio)
Clinton County Courthouse Complex in New York